Karlstadt may refer to:

 Karlstadt am Main, Germany
 Karlovac, Croatia (German name Karlstadt)
 Karlstad, Sweden
 Karlstad, Minnesota

People with the surname
 Andreas Karlstadt, contemporary of Martin Luther during the Reformation

See also 
 Carlstadt (disambiguation)
 Kallstadt, Germany